William Bull (1886 – 1970) was a British diver. He competed in the men's 3 metre springboard event at the 1908 Summer Olympics.

References

1886 births
1970 deaths
British male divers
Olympic divers of Great Britain
Divers at the 1908 Summer Olympics
Place of birth missing